LRCS may refer to:
The ICAO code for Caransebeș Airport
League of Red Cross Societies
Licentiate of the Royal College of Surgeons